Bob Dishy is an American actor of stage, film, and television.

Biography
Dishy served in the U.S. Army in the late 1950s, touring military bases in a show called Rolling Along in '57 after winning an All-Army Entertainment Contest.

He is best remembered today for playing Sergeant John J. Wilson, Columbo's polite, respectful assistant in two episodes of Columbo ("Now You See Him" and "The Greenhouse Jungle") and as “Mister Terrific” in one episode of The Golden Girls. He also appeared in several episodes of Law & Order.

His film appearances included Lovers and Other Strangers (1970), I Wonder Who's Killing Her Now? (1975), The Big Bus (1976), The Last Married Couple in America (1980), First Family (1980), Author! Author! (1982), Brighton Beach Memoirs (1986), Critical Condition (1987), Stay Tuned (1992), Used People (1992), Don Juan DeMarco (1994), Jungle 2 Jungle (1997) and Along Came Polly (2004). 

He was a regular on That Was The Week That Was, a weekly satirical series that aired on NBC-TV in 1964–65.

He made his stage debut as a replacement for the ballplayer Rocky in the original run of the hit musical Damn Yankees: a role he reprised ten years later for the TV adaptation. In 1965 Dishy co-starred with Liza Minnelli in the Broadway musical, "Flora, The Red Menace" directed by George Abbott.

He went on to appear on Broadway and in television in:

References

External links

Yahoo! Movies entry

1934 births
Male actors from New York City
American male film actors
American male stage actors
American male television actors
Drama Desk Award winners
Living people
People from Brooklyn
20th-century American male actors
21st-century American male actors